Albert Edward Johnson (February 18, 1912August 10, 1993) was a professional American football running back for seven seasons in the National Football League.

External links
Bert Johnson player page

1912 births
1993 deaths
Sportspeople from Ashland, Kentucky
Players of American football from Kentucky
American football running backs
Kentucky Wildcats football players
Brooklyn Dodgers (NFL) players
Chicago Bears players
Chicago Cardinals players
Philadelphia Eagles players